Saint-Louis-de-Gonzague is a parish municipality in the Beauharnois-Salaberry Regional County Municipality in the Montérégie region of Quebec, Canada. The population as of the Canada 2021 Census was 1,950.

Demographics 

See also
 Beauharnois-Salaberry Regional County Municipality
 Beauharnois Canal
 Saint-Louis River (Beauharnois)
 List of parish municipalities in Quebec

References

External links
 

Parish municipalities in Quebec
Incorporated places in Beauharnois-Salaberry Regional County Municipality
Quebec populated places on the Saint Lawrence River